Tisiphone is a genus of butterflies of the subfamily Satyrinae in the family Nymphalidae. The genus was erected by Jacob Hübner in 1819.

Species
Listed alphabetically:
Tisiphone abeona (Donovan, 1805) – sword grass brown
Tisiphone helena (Olliff, 1888) – Helena brown

References

Satyrini
Butterfly genera
Taxa named by Jacob Hübner